The 1780 British general election returned members to serve in the House of Commons of the 15th Parliament of Great Britain to be summoned after the merger of the Parliament of England and the Parliament of Scotland in 1707.  The election was held during the American War of Independence and returned Lord North to form a new government with a small and rocky majority. The opposition consisted largely of the Rockingham Whigs, the Whig faction led by the Marquess of Rockingham. North's opponents referred to his supporters as Tories, but no Tory party existed at the time and his supporters rejected the label.

Summary of the constituencies
See 1796 British general election for details. The constituencies used were the same throughout the existence of the Parliament of Great Britain.

Dates of election
The general election was held between 6 September 1780 and 18 October 1780.

At this period elections did not take place at the same time in every constituency. The returning officer in each county or parliamentary borough fixed the precise date (see hustings for details of the conduct of the elections).

Results

Seats summary

See also
List of parliaments of Great Britain
List of MPs elected in the British general election, 1780

References

 British Electoral Facts 1832–1999, compiled and edited by Colin Rallings and Michael Thrasher (Ashgate Publishing Ltd 2000). (For dates of elections before 1832, see the footnote to Table 5.02).
  (1964). The House of Commons, 1754–1790. New York, Published for the History of Parliament Trust by Oxford University Press

1780 elections
1780 in Great Britain
1780